Tom Gralish is a Pulitzer Prize-winning American photographer. 

Born in Mount Clemens, Michigan, he worked for United Press International and the now-defunct Las Vegas Valley Times before coming to work for the Philadelphia Inquirer in 1983 as a photographer and photo editor. On April 7, 1985, he shot a series of photographs of homeless people on the streets of Philadelphia. This series was awarded the Pulitzer Prize in 1986, when Gralish was 29 years old.

References

External links
"Philadelphia's Homeless - 1985", Gralish's Pulitzer-winning photo essay
"Scene on the Road", Gralish's blog for the Inquirer.
Pulitzer listing

American photojournalists
Pulitzer Prize for Feature Photography winners
Living people
People from Mount Clemens, Michigan
Year of birth missing (living people)